Birthday suit is an informal term for the naked human body (as people are at birth).

Birthday suit may also refer to:

Film and television
 Birthday Suit – with scars and defects, a 1974 work by video artist Lisa Steele
 "Birthday Suits," a 2007 episode of the television series Billable Hours
 "Birthday Suits," a 2007 episode of the television series Keeping Up with the Kardashians
 "Birthday Suit," a 2009 episode of the television series Life on Top
 "The Birthday Suits," a 2009 episode of the animated series Chowder

Music
 The Birthday Suit, a Scottish rock band

Songs
 "Birthday Suit," a song from the Cosmo Sheldrake album The Much Much How How and I (2018)
 "Birthday Suit," a song performed by Johnny Kemp on the soundtrack of the 1989 film Sing
 "Birthday Suit," a song from the Pleasure P album The Introduction of Marcus Cooper (2009)
 "Birthday Suit," a song from the Saafir album Trigonometry (1998)
 "Birthday Suit," a song from the Sean Paul album Imperial Blaze (2009)
 "Birthday Suit," a song from the Weeknd's unreleased leaked EP The Noise (2009)
 "Birthday Suit," a track from Bill Engvall's 2009 comedy album Aged and Confused
 "Birthday Suit," a song from the Kesha album High Road (2020)